First Avenue Records (also 1st Avenue) was a British record label and publishing company. The publishing side of the company was acquired by BMG Music Publishing in 2002. After Universal Music Publishing's acquisition of BMG Music Publishing in 2004, First Avenue Music then belonged to Universal Music Publishing.

The brains behind First Avenue Records were Oliver Smallman and Denis Ingoldsby. They handled artist management, signed and developed acts, pretty much acting as A&R for record labels. Licensed acts included Quartz, record producers/DJs/remixers Dave Rawlings and Ronnie Herel - PolyGram, Dina Carroll - A&M, Michelle Gayle - RCA, Eternal, Louise and Dana Dawson - EMI, MN8 - Columbia, the Honeyz - Mercury, and Kele Le Roc - Polydor/Wildcard Records.

The label launched in 1991 with a dance cover of Carole King's "It's Too Late" by Quartz featuring Dina Carroll which was a hit, reaching No. 8 in the UK Singles Chart and introducing Carroll who later released So Close.  These were followed by another million seller, Eternal's Always & Forever. Success continued until the late 1990s with most of their acts being dropped from their labels.

Artists 

 Dana Dawson
 Dina Carroll
 Eternal
 Honeyz
 Kéllé Bryan
 Kele Le Roc
 Louise
 Märy Kiani
 Michelle Gayle
 MN8
 Thunderbugs

See also
 List of record labels

References

External links
 Smallman and Harrison Evolve with new partnership | Music Week
 Denis Ingoldsby - free company director check. Director id 907503507 - Companies House Information
 

British record labels
Defunct record labels of the United Kingdom
Contemporary R&B record labels